The 2013–14 Gamma Ethniki was the 31st season since the official establishment of the third tier of Greek football in 1983.
It was scheduled to start on 22 September 2013.

93 teams were separated into six groups, according to geographical criteria.

Thrasyvoulos, Anagennisi Epanomi, and Pelopas Kiato F.C. withdrew from the league before the group draw.

Group 1

Teams

note: Makedonikos relegated from 2010–11 Football league 2 season and they were going to play in Fourth division next season, but FIFA and EPO punished them with 2 years exclusion due to debts to a former player. As the exclusion concluded in 2013–2014 season and Fourth Division no longer existed, FIFA and EPO accepted Makedonikos participation in 2013–14 Football league 2 season.

Standings

Group 2

Teams

Standings

Group 3

Teams

Standings

Group 4

Teams

 Asteras Amaliada place was originally belonged to P.F.O Panopoulo who finished first in 2012–13 Fourth Division Group 6. However, the two teams were merged in August 2013.

Standings

Group 5

Teams

Standings

Group 6

Teams

Standings

References

Third level Greek football league seasons
3
Greece